The Queensland Parks and Wildlife Service (QPWS) is a business division of the Department of Environment and Science within the Government of Queensland. The division’s primary concern is with the management and maintenance of protected areas within Queensland, to protect and manage Queensland’s parks, forests and the Great Barrier Reef for current and future generations.

The QPWS managed areas include more than 1000 national parks, state forests, marine parks and other protected areas, and five world heritage areas. Of these, 220 are national parks. 

Queensland’s first national park, Witches Falls (in today’s Tamborine National Park), was established on 28 March 1908, followed by Bunya Mountains National Park in July 1908, and then Lamington National Park in 1915. From modest early beginnings within the Forestry department, a dedicated national parks service was established in 1975—the Queensland Parks and Wildlife Service. From that time, park rangers have proudly worn QPWS uniform badge featuring the symbol, Herbie (Herbert River ringtail possum), which has become one of the most well-recognised symbols in Queensland.

The Nature Conservation Act 1992, Marine Parks Act 2004 and Forestry Act 1959 provide guiding legislation for the service. Meaghan Scanlon, Minister for Environment and Science is responsible for the department. The agency's head office is located at 400 George Street in the Brisbane central business district.

Functions
Protected areas in Queensland are needed to provide wildlife habitat to maintain biodiversity and provide opportunities for outdoor nature-based activities.  Managing national parks involves protecting a park's natural condition and processes, presenting the park's cultural and natural resources and its values; and ensuring that park use is nature-based and ecologically sustainable.

Managing multiple-use marine parks involves providing refuge areas for species and ecosystems while allowing for continuing recreational and commercial use of the majority of the marine environment.

A Master Plan for Queensland's Park System outlines the directions for management of all protected areas in Queensland for the next 20 years.

QPWS is responsible for day-to-day management of Queensland’s five World Heritage areas, which are (mostly) within the protected area estate. These properties are outstanding examples of the world's natural or cultural heritage, and provide highly valuable environmental, tourism and economic services for Queensland.

For each park, either a management statement or a management plan is prepared to identify the park's special values and determine ways to ensure those values are preserved, enhanced or maintained.

The service employs park rangers who are responsible for constructing and maintaining infrastructure such as camping areas, picnic areas, amenities, walking tracks and lookouts providing advice to visitors, recording wildlife data, controlling feral plants and animals, assisting in the preparation of management plans and enforcing park rules.

QPWS also works closely with Aboriginal Traditional Owners and, in some places, volunteers, as well as other government departments and organisations to conserve, manage, share and present Queensland’s most precious natural and cultural places.

See also

Wildlife Preservation Society of Queensland

References

External links
 Find a park or forest

Government agencies of Queensland
Environment of Queensland
1998 establishments in Australia
Environmental agencies of country subdivisions
Government agencies established in 1998
Protected area administrators of Australia